János Takács (born 1 November 1963) is a Hungarian wrestler. He competed at the 1988 Summer Olympics and the 1996 Summer Olympics.

References

External links
 

1963 births
Living people
Hungarian male sport wrestlers
Olympic wrestlers of Hungary
Wrestlers at the 1988 Summer Olympics
Wrestlers at the 1992 Summer Olympics
People from Tatabánya
Sportspeople from Komárom-Esztergom County
20th-century Hungarian people